Yijian Zhi is a Chinese zhiguai story collection by Hong Mai of the Southern Song dynasty. It originally comprised 420 chapters, but today less than a half has survived. The first chapter was completed in 1161, and some surviving chapters were completed in 1198 or later.

A partial English translation was published under the title of Record of the Listener.

Description
Hong Mai (1123–1202) had always interested himself in popular stories, and he titled his story collection after the ancient writer Yijian, who, according to the Liezi, wrote down the stories he heard.

The stories are very heterogeneous: gods and ghosts, injustice and retribution, fantasy and uncanny have all been included in its storylines. There are 2692 stories in the 206 chapters that have survived. Chang Fu-jui classified them thus:

Reception
The stories have inspired numerous vernacular stories and Chinese operas. Zhou Mi of the late Song dynasty criticized the book as "greedy and acquisitive, full of eeriness."

The book is considered highly valuable by modern researchers, because it provides rare insight into the economic, social, technological, and cultural-religious conditions of the Song dynasty. Because some stories are also found in other books, how they altered during the course of oral transmissions is also of interest.

English translation
 Zhang's selection contains a hundred stories.

References

Chinese short story collections
Song dynasty literature
1198 books
12th-century Chinese books